Dave Highton (born 31 January 1980) is a former professional rugby league footballer who played as a  for the Warrington Wolves, Salford City Reds and the London Broncos in the European Super League. He signed for Halifax to play in National League One, but injury forced him to retire aged just 25.

Whilst at Warrington he was given a 10 month ban for steroid use for which he was sacked by the Wolves. He was later given a chance to resurrect his career at Salford.

His elder brothers Paul Highton and Chris Highton also played professional rugby league, with Paul playing for Wales at international level and Chris featuring for Warrington and the Swinton Lions.

References

External links
London Broncos profile

1980 births
Living people
English rugby league players
Halifax R.L.F.C. players
London Broncos players
Rugby league hookers
Rugby league players from Billinge, Merseyside
Salford Red Devils players
Warrington Wolves players